BNK may refer to:

BNK Petroleum, a California-based oil company spun off in 2008 from Bankers Petroleum
 Bankers Petroleum (Toronto Stock Exchange symbol), a Canadian oil company
 Ballina Byron Gateway Airport (IATA code), a small regional airport in Ballina, New South Wales, Australia
 The Kurdish Digital Library, (French: La bibliothèque numérique kurde (BNK))
 BNK, a Russian aviation acronym for Byuro Novykh Konstruktsiy (Bureau of New Construction)
 BNK, (Ru:Военно-промышленная компания, Voyenno-promyshlennaya kompaniya) Military Industrial Company
 BNK, a computer file format
 "B.N.K.", a song by Bone Thugs-N-Harmony from The Collection
 B-NK (Progenitor for B and NK), a term related to lymphopoiesis
 BNK, Busan Bank
 BNK48, an idol group based in Bangkok, Thailand